The 2001 Atlanta Falcons season was the franchise’s 36th season in the National Football League (NFL). The Falcons obtained the first pick overall in the 2001 NFL Draft. With the pick, the Falcons drafted Virginia Tech quarterback Michael Vick.

This was Jamal Anderson’s final season as he re-aggravated his surgically repaired knee in Week 3, and this time, it ended his career. The Falcons improved on their 9–23 record from the previous two seasons, but still failed to qualify for the postseason for the third consecutive campaign after a 6-4 start.

This was the final season under the Falcons' founding ownership, the Rankin M. Smith Sr. family, as the franchise was sold to The Home Depot co-founder Arthur Blank in March 2002.

Offseason 
Vick was selected in the 2001 NFL Draft as the first overall pick and first African American quarterback taken number 1 in the NFL Draft. The San Diego Chargers had the number one selection spot in the draft that year but traded the rights to the first overall choice to the Atlanta Falcons a day before the draft, for which they received the Falcons’ first round pick (5th overall) and third round pick in 2001 (used to draft CB Tay Cody), a second round pick in 2002 (used to draft WR Reche Caldwell) and WR/KR Tim Dwight. With the Chargers’ downgraded spot (the 5th overall), they selected Texas Christian University running back LaDainian Tomlinson, who went on to become league MVP in 2006. Although Vick has never become league MVP, he finished second in voting in 2004. In this way, Tomlinson and Vick are linked as having been “traded” for each other, although the transaction was actually the result of traded draft picks and contract negotiations.

NFL Draft

Undrafted free agents

Personnel

Staff

Roster

Regular season 
This was the Falcons’ 32nd and final season as a member of the NFC West Division. If one counts its predecessor, the Coastal Division of the NFL’s Western Conference prior to the 1970 merger, it was the franchise’s 35th season in this division. The Falcons moved to the new NFC South as part of the NFL’s realignment plan for the following season.

Schedule

Standings

References

External links 
 2001 Atlanta Falcons at Pro-Football-Reference.com

Atlanta Falcons
Atlanta Falcons seasons
Atlanta